Kosciuscola tristis, known generally as the chameleon skyhopper, is a species of short-horned grasshopper in the family Acrididae. It is found in Australia.

Subspecies
These subspecies belong to the species Kosciuscola tristis:
 Kosciuscola tristis restrictus Rehn, 1957
 Kosciuscola tristis tristis Sjöstedt, 1934 (Chameleon Grasshopper)

References

External links

 

Oxyinae
Taxa named by Bror Yngve Sjöstedt
Taxa described in 1934